Tinkers Hill is situated in the range of Malvern Hills that runs about  north-south along the Herefordshire-Worcestershire border. It lies to the east of Herefordshire Beacon with views across the Vale of Evesham and the Cotswolds.

In June 2004, the Worcestershire Bat Group identified Tinkers Hill Wood as being home to a colony of barbastelles, a species of bat protected under the European Habitats Directive.

References

Marilyns of England
Hills of Worcestershire
Malvern Hills